The Mitsubishi Fuso Aero Midi (kana: 三菱ふそう・エアロミディ) is a step-entrance, low entry and low floor midibus produced by the Japanese manufacturer  Mitsubishi Fuso. It is primarily available as public buses and sightseeing buses ranged from lengths of 7.0m to 10.1m. The range can be built as either a complete bus or a bus chassis.

The Mitsubishi Fuso MK Series was built between 1974 and 1988. The Aero Midi appeared in 1988 after the replacement for the MK Series. The Aero Midi ceased production in 2007 and replaced by the Aero Midi-S in 2008. After the Aero Midi-S ceased production in 2010, production of the Aero Midi city bus recommenced in the following year. The Mitsubishi Fuso Aero Midi is the low entry and smaller version of the low floor Mitsubishi Fuso Aero Star city bus.

MK Series (1974-1988) 
MK103H (1974)
MK115 (1976)
K-MK116 (1979)
P-MK116/516 (1984)

Aero Midi (First generation, 1988-1993) 
P-MK117/126/517 (1988)
P-MM117/517 (1988)
P-MJ117/527 (1988)
U-MK117/517 (1990)
U-MJ517/527 (1990)
U-MM117/517 (1990)

Aero Midi (Second generation, 1993-2007, 2011-present) 
U-MK117/218/517/525/527/595/618 (1993)
U-MJ217/628 (1993)
KC-MK219/619 (1995)
KC-MK219J (One-step bus, 1998)
KC-MJ218/629 (1995)
KK-MK23/25/26/27 (1999)
KK-MJ23/26 (1999)
KK-ME17 (2002)
PA-MK17/25/27 (2005)
PA-MJ26 (2005)
PA-ME17 (2005)
SKG-MK27 (2011)
TKG-MK27 (2012)

Aero Midi-S (2008-2010) 
The Aero Midi-S is a rebadged Nissan Diesel Space Runner RM and Nissan Diesel Space Runner JP. A common design is that it has a rounded roof dome (similar to the Nissan Diesel Space Runner RM and the Nissan Diesel Space Runner JP) with a double-curvature windscreen and a separately mounted destination sign.
PDG-AR820 (2008)
PDG-AJ820 (2008)

Model lineup 
MK Tour 9m
MK Line Non-step bus 10.5m, 9m
MK Line One-step bus 9m
MJ Tour 7m
ME Line Non-step bus 7m

See also 

Mitsubishi Fuso Truck & Bus Corporation
 List of buses

References

External links 

Aero Midi (Japan)
Mitsubishi Fuso Aero Midi Worldwide "MK"

Aero Midi
Bus chassis
Buses of Japan
Midibuses
Minibuses
Low-entry buses
Low-floor buses
Step-entrance buses
Vehicles introduced in 1988